Lal Baadshah is a 1999 Indian Hindi-language crime drama film directed by K. C. Bokadia, starring Amitabh Bachchan in a dual role, Raghuvaran, Manisha Koirala, Shilpa Shetty and Amrish Puri. Nirupa Roy also appears in her last film playing Bachchan's foster mother. This was released in the declining period of Bachchan's career and failed at the box office. However, owing to charisma of Bachchan, who brilliantly played a Bihari speaking hero, the movie was a hit in Eastern U.P. and Bihar.

Plot
Lal Singh (Amitabh Bachchan) lives with his mother (Nirupa Roy) in a small basti in Bombay, and grew up with the poor and needy. He is called Lal Badshah by the people he lives among. Lal is a very helping person and dead-set against crime. In the same city lives Vikram Singh, alias Vicky Baadshah (Raghuvaran), who is the Don of the city always clashing with Lal Baadshah. Vicky is the son of Dayal Singh (Amrish Puri), who lives far away from Mumbai in a castle. Vicky and his brother Ajit Singh (Mukesh Rishi), a corrupt police officer want to rule the city.

Meanwhile, Lal meets Kiran (Manisha Koirala), an L.I.C. agent who falls in love with him and is determined to become his wife. At the castle, Dayal Singh is still hunting for the treasures of the Maharaja, whom he murdered years ago along with his brother Sultan Singh (Prem Chopra). When the Maharaja was murdered, his son, Dewan Ranbir Singh (also Amitabh Bachchan) hid the treasure, for which Dayal Singh tried to murder him.

Cast
 Amitabh Bachchan as Lal Singh "Lal Baadshah" / Ranveer Singh (Double Role)
 Manisha Koirala as Kiran 
 Raadhika as Wife of Ranveer Singh
 Amrish Puri as Thakur Dayal Singh
 Shilpa Shetty as Lawyer's daughter
 Shakti Kapoor as Balu
 Raghuvaran as Vikram Singh "Vicky"
 Mukesh Rishi as SP Ajit Singh 
 Nirupa Roy as Lal's Foster Mother
 Prem Chopra as Sultan Singh 
 Mohan Joshi as a Lawyer
 Jack Gaud as Jabbar Singh
 Shama Deshpande
 Mac Mohan as Vikram's Henchman
 Ram Mohan
 Sudhir as Vikram's Henchman
 Brijesh Tiwari
 Mahesh Anand as Narayan Singh
 Viju Khote as Kiran's Boss
 Pramod Moutho as Maharaja
 Nagma as a Dancer in song, "Pattai Ley Humka Tu"

Soundtrack
The music was composed by Aadesh Shrivastav. Lyrics were penned by Shyam Raj, Maya Govind and Gauhar Kanpuri.

Track listing

References

External links 

1999 films
1990s Hindi-language films
Films scored by Aadesh Shrivastava
1999 crime drama films
Indian crime drama films
Films directed by K. C. Bokadia